Lake of Dreams may refer to:

 Lacus Somniorum, a plain on the Moon
 Lake of Dreams, a multimedia show at Resorts World Sentosa in Sentosa, Singapore
 Lake of Dreams, a multimedia show at Wynn Las Vegas in Las Vegas, Nevada, U.S.